Scionecra is a genus of Asian stick insects in the tribe Necrosciini, erected by Heinrich Hugo Karny in 1923.  Species have been recorded from: China, Vietnam, Malesia through to Australia.

Species
The Phasmida Species File lists:
 Scionecra agrionina (Bates, 1865)
 Scionecra agrionoides (Redtenbacher, 1908)
 Scionecra clavigera (Redtenbacher, 1908)
 Scionecra conspicua (Redtenbacher, 1908)
 Scionecra falcata (Redtenbacher, 1908)
 Scionecra flabellata (Redtenbacher, 1908)
 Scionecra huai Ho, 2014
 Scionecra jiewhoei Seow-Choen, 2017
 Scionecra maculata Ho, 2014
 Scionecra microptera (Redtenbacher, 1908)
 Scionecra milledgei Hasenpusch & Brock, 2007
 Scionecra osmylus (Westwood, 1859) - type species (as Necroscia osmylus Westwood)
 Scionecra phonae Brock & Seow-Choen, 2021
 Scionecra pseudocerca (Chen & He, 2008)
 Scionecra queenslandica (Sjöstedt, 1918)
 Scionecra refractaria (Redtenbacher, 1908)
 Scionecra seriata (Redtenbacher, 1908)
 Scionecra spinipennis (Redtenbacher, 1908)
 Scionecra spinosa Ho, 2013
 Scionecra truncata (Redtenbacher, 1908)

References

External links

Phasmatodea genera
Phasmatodea of Asia
Lonchodidae